Oxford Bus Company is the trading name of The City of Oxford Motor Services Ltd. It is a bus operator serving the city and surrounding area of Oxford, England. It is a subsidiary of the Go-Ahead Group.

History

Horse trams and horse buses
The City of Oxford and District Tramway Company served Oxford with horse-drawn trams from 1881. By 1898 its network served Abingdon Road, Banbury Road, Cowley Road, Walton Street and both  and  railway stations.

Horse bus services developed to complement the tramway network. By the early 20th century both Iffley Road and Woodstock Road were horse bus routes. On Saturdays only there were horse buses from Headington to the city centre and from Cowley village to the tram terminus in Cowley Road.

In 1906 the City of Oxford Electric Traction Company took over from the City of Oxford and District Tramway Company. It planned to electrify and expand the network, but was defeated by local opposition.

Motor buses
In 1913–14, and under threat of competition from William Morris and Frank Gray, the tram company replaced its trams and horse buses with Daimler motor buses.

In 1921, the company was renamed City of Oxford Motor Services Limited (COMS). It continued to expand its operations into the surrounding countryside. From the 1930s, COMS was controlled by British Electric Traction, with the Great Western Railway having a minority shareholding. The fleet livery was red with maroon and pale green relief. Most of its buses were built on AEC chassis and running gear. Numerous former COMS buses have been preserved, including a large and notable collection at the Oxford Bus Museum in Long Hanborough in Oxfordshire.

In 1969 COMS became a subsidiary of the National Bus Company. Greater integration of city and country services began. In 1971, the Oxford – London coach operator South Midland, which had been controlled by the neighbouring Thames Valley Traction company, was transferred to COMS and the fleet name for the entire operation became Oxford South Midland.

An acute problem for the operator was the competition for staff with Morris Motors, whose Cowley factory was near the Oxford garage. One response was to move to one person operation of buses in the 1970s.

After some trials, the Oxford company established the city's pioneering park and ride bus services in 1978. The London express service began in the same year.

In 1983, COMS was split into separate Oxford and South Midland units. The Oxford Bus Company was allocated the Oxford city services and the London routes, and South Midland was allocated the remainder of the network. Both companies were subject to management buyouts. The South Midland company was soon resold to Thames Transit (later Stagecoach South Midlands), which introduced minibus competition. Oxford Bus Company tried to counter this with minibuses under the Oxford City Nipper brand name.

In 1990, the Oxford Bus Company acquired the High Wycombe operations of the Bee Line, and ran them under the Wycombe Bus brand name. In March 1994, the Go-Ahead Group bought Oxford Bus Company. In 2000, Go-Ahead sold the High Wycombe operation to Arriva. The company's long-established main depot in Cowley Road, Oxford was closed in 2004, replaced by a new depot opened in Watlington Road.

In July 2009, Oxford Bus Company took over Oxford Brookes University's BrookesBus contract.

Go-Ahead bought Thames Travel in 2011 and Carousel Buses in 2012. They now share Oxford Bus Company management but retain their separate identities.

In October 2019, it was announced that the X90 service between Oxford and London would be withdrawn from 4 January 2020, due to a 35% fall in passenger numbers since 2015 causing the route to be unprofitable.

Bus location technology

All Oxford Bus Company buses and coaches have automatic vehicle location (AVL) equipment installed which works via GPS technology. The AVL equipment installed on each bus or coach gives geographical location to within a few metres and is updating central control room every few seconds. This information technology can therefore be seen in real time at the central control room, which helps in managing the fleet.

The AVL equipment is also coupled to a real-time passenger information system at over 250 bus stop display screens around Oxford City and surrounding towns, and via a smartphone app. This coupled information technology system gives the public "predicted times" of bus and coach services around Oxford City and surrounding towns.

Oxfordshire County Council also uses this information technology to provide traffic-light priority for buses at some road junctions.

The real-time passenger information system is managed by OxonTime, which is a partnership between various bus companies and Oxfordshire County Council.

Brands
Oxford Bus Company currently operates services under five brands:

Fleet
As of July 2021, Oxford Bus Company's fleet comprises 147 vehicles, with 5 buses, 100 double deckers, 21 coaches, 5 interdeckers (Coaches in which there is a full size upper cabin, and a small one behind the driver, usually used for wheelchair access, which contains around 5 seats on most models), 6 minibuses and 10 ancillary vehicles.

Notes
Buses branded for particular 'City' Services do not always operate on their branded routes, and likewise unbranded buses can often be seen running them.

See also
List of bus operators of the United Kingdom

References

Bibliography

External links

Oxford Bus Company official website

 – weekly local bus news, archived from October 2002 onward

Bus operators in Oxfordshire
Coach operators in England
Companies based in Oxford
Former nationalised industries of the United Kingdom
Go-Ahead Group companies
Transport in Oxford
Transport in Oxfordshire
British companies established in 1881
Transport companies established in 1881
1881 establishments in England